İshaklı can refer to:

 İshaklı, Alanya
 İshaklı, Bayat
 İshaklı, Çivril